is a Japanese singer, actor and model. He is a member of Hey! Say! JUMP. He played Koji Kiritani in the 2005 Japanese television drama, Nobuta wo Produce.

Career

2004: Becoming an artist for Johnny's Entertainment
Nakajima joined Johnny's Jr. on March 28, 2004, in his 5th year of elementary school. After joining Johnny's Jr., he began performing together with J.J.Express as one of the five original members along with Kouhei Matsumoto, Takumi Yamashita, Yuta Tamamori, and current Hey! Say! JUMP member, Kei Inoo.

2005–2007: Initial acting experience and first Hey! Say! JUMP appearance
In 2005, he made his debut as an actor and had appeared in a couple of dramas including the drama special for 24 Hour Television, and Nobuta wo Produce with two of his agency seniors, Kazuya Kamenashi, and Tomohisa Yamashita. He also appeared in Engine along with current groupmate, Daiki Arioka. He continued his junior work and was cast in the drama Primadam in 2006, and towards the end of the year, he was chosen to be part of Tap Kids, a Johnny's Jr. group, along with Noriyuki Kanda.

In April 2007, he was chosen to be a member of the temporary group, Hey! Say! 7 with four others, and made his CD debut on August 1, with their single "Hey! Say!", which hit number one on the Oricon charts. On September 24 of that same year, during a live television event from the Johnny's Jr's concert in Yokohama Arena, it was announced that the group would debut under a new name, Hey! Say! JUMP, with the five from Hey! Say! 7, plus five others. The debut single was released on November 14, titled Ultra Music Power, and also took first place on the Oricon charts.

2008–2011: Leading role at drama Sensei Wa Erai and debut group album JUMP No. 1
On April 12, 2008, Nakajima got his first lead role on the drama Sensei Wa Erai along with his co Hey! Say! JUMP member Daiki Arioka, Ryosuke Yamada, Yuri Chinen.

On October 11, 2008, Nakajima played another lead role in the drama called Scrap Teacher. The theme song used in the drama was Hey! Say! JUMP's fourth single "Mayonaka no Shadow Boy". Daiki Arioka, Ryosuke Yamada, Yuri Chinen also co-star in the drama.

During their press conference at Yokohama Arena, current groupmate, Kota Yabu announced that Hey! Say! JUMP would release their debut album in the summer, in which members would write songs and lyrics. One of them was Nakajima who wrote the lyrics of "Dash!!", which was track number 15 on the album JUMP No.1.

2012–present: Rise to popularity and prominence
Nakajima appeared as Koji Kobayashi in NTV's comedy drama Perfect Son with his groupmate Ryosuke Yamada, which started on January 14, 2012. On February 17, it was reported that Nakajima together with Yamada and Chinen had officially graduated from Horikoshi High School.

On July 10, 2012, his appearance on the August issue of Fine Boys Magazine also marked his entrance in the professional world of modelling. Later that year, too, it was announced that he would participate in Hey! Say! JUMP's upcoming April 2013 – April 2014 annual calendar as a photographer.

In January 2013, he co-starred in the TV drama Sharehouse no Koibito alongside Mizukawa Asami and Oizumi Yo. He then played another supporting role in the summer TV drama Hanzawa Naoki starring Masato Sakai, which started on July 7, 2013. He also had a small role in Tokyo Bandwagon that fall.

In the spring of 2014, Nakajima was announced as part of the big-cast drama series Yowakutemo Katemasu starring his agency's senior and Arashi member Ninomiya Kazunari. That summer became another big break for Nakajima as he got his first starring drama role in Suikyu Yankees. Yuya Takaki also co-stars in the drama.

Nakajima started 2015 with a hit romantic comedy drama Date starring Watanabe Anne and Hasegawa Hiroki. That same month, it was announced that he will star his very first movie, Pink to Gray, a novel adaptation written by his agency's senior and NEWS member Shigeaki Kato. The movie was directed by renowned director Yukisada Isao.

On October 1, 2015, Nakajima, along with co-star Suda Masaki and director Yukisada, flew to Korea for the world premiere of the said movie in Busan International Film Festival.

Nakajima again appeared in the TV special of his earlier drama Date.

Discography

Solo songs
 "鹿山海"
 Antib the Desmond

Group participations
 Big Fat Bussy
 Small but Big (January 2006)
 Tap Kids (August 2006)
 J.J.Express ちびっこチーム (January – September 2007)
 Hey! Say! 7 (Temporary) (April 3 – September 30, 2007)
 Hey! Say! JUMP (September 24, 2007–present)
 Hey! Say! 7 (September 2007–present)

Concerts
For Hey! Say! JUMP-related concerts, see Hey! Say! JUMP.

Filmography

Films

Dramas

Variety shows

Theatre

References

External links 
 Hey! Say! JUMP
 Johnny's-net

Living people
Hey! Say! JUMP members
Johnny & Associates
Horikoshi High School alumni
Singers from Tokyo
Male actors from Tokyo
Japanese male pop singers
Japanese dance music singers
Japanese rhythm and blues singers
Japanese hip hop singers
Japanese male television actors
Japanese male film actors
Japanese idols
21st-century Japanese singers
21st-century Japanese male singers
21st-century Japanese male actors
Japanese male child actors
Year of birth missing (living people)